"Never Been Any Reason" is the debut single by Head East from their debut album Flat as a Pancake. It was composed by the band's guitarist, Mike Somerville. It is often considered Head East's signature song, peaking at number 68 on the Billboard Hot 100, and continues to be played on classic rock radio stations in the US, generations after it was released.

The song features keyboardist Roger Boyd's double-tracked Minimoog solos throughout the song. Asked about the solos via the band's official website, Boyd said they were created due to an accident during mixing:

"It is two Minimoogs. Back in those days we did not have computerized mixing and had to mix "on the fly;" we forgot to mute one of the moog solos and when it went by we thought WOW! so we decided to go back and record the second part to  the primary solo part."

Lead vocals are alternated between drummer Steve Huston singing the first two lines of the verses and lead vocalist John Schlitt on the remainder of the song. Both the last line of each verse and the choruses feature multi-part vocal harmonies sung by all the members of the band.

The song was featured in the 1993 film Dazed and Confused, and later in the 2005 film Sahara.

References

1975 debut singles
1975 songs
A&M Records singles